Albert Ernest Coleby (1876 – 15 July 1930) was a British film director, actor and screenwriter of the silent era.

Selected filmography

Director
 Peg Woffington (1912)
 Mysteries of London (1915)
 The Lure of Drink (1915)
 Kent, the Fighting Man (1916)
 Thelma (1918)
 The Secret Woman (1918)
 The Silver Lining (1919)
 The Call of the Road (1920)
 The Way of the World (1920)
 The Right to Live (1921)
 Long Odds (1922)
 The Peacemaker (1922)
 The Prodigal Son (1923)
 The Mystery of Dr. Fu Manchu (1923)
 The Rest Cure (1923)
 The Great Prince Shan (1924)
 The Flying Fifty-Five (1924)
 The Prehistoric Man (1924)
 The Moon Diamond (1926)
 The Locked Door (1927)
 Over the Sticks (1929)

Actor
 The Secret Woman (1918)
 The Way of the World (1920)
 The Great Prince Shan (1924)

References

External links
 

1876 births
1930 deaths
English male film actors
English male silent film actors
20th-century English male actors
English film directors
Male actors from London
20th-century British male actors